Renato Vieira Rodrigues (born 31 January 1992), commonly known as Renatinho is a Brazilian footballer who plays for Sampaio Corrêa as a midfielder.

Club career
Born in Foz do Iguaçu, Renatinho is a graduate of the youth academy of Atlético Paranaense and was promoted to the senior team in 2012. He spent the following years; initially at loan to Ferroviária and then had successive stints at Foz do Iguaçu, Campinense and at Mirassol. He was a part of the Mirassol squad which finished runners-up in the Campeonato Paulista Série A2 where he scored four goals in 22 matches.

On 15 July 2016, Renatinho joined Guarani. In the following January, he joined Série B club Paraná on loan. After having ended the Campeonato Paranaense as the club's top scorer, he scored his first goal for the club in Série B in a 2–0 victory over Goiás on 17 May. He contributed with 18 goals in 54 matches, ending the season as the club's top scorer.

Although Renatinho received offers from Chinese, Japanese and Brazilian clubs (Vasco da Gama, Bahia, Vitória), he joined Botafogo on a year long loan deal on 10 January 2018. On 21 December, left the club.

On 4 January 2019, Renatinho signed for Goiás.

Honours

Club
Botafogo
 Campeonato Carioca: 2018

References

External links

1992 births
Living people
People from Foz do Iguaçu
Campeonato Brasileiro Série B players
Campeonato Brasileiro Série C players
Campeonato Brasileiro Série D players
Association football midfielders
Brazilian footballers
Club Athletico Paranaense players
Associação Ferroviária de Esportes players
Campinense Clube players
Operário Ferroviário Esporte Clube players
Mirassol Futebol Clube players
Guarani FC players
Paraná Clube players
Botafogo de Futebol e Regatas players
Goiás Esporte Clube players
Centro Sportivo Alagoano players
Avaí FC players
Botafogo Futebol Clube (SP) players
Grêmio Esportivo Brasil players
Sampaio Corrêa Futebol Clube players
Sportspeople from Paraná (state)